Savalia savaglia, commonly known as gold coral, is a species of colonial false black coral in the family Parazoanthidae. It is native to the northeastern Atlantic Ocean and the Mediterranean Sea where it often grows in association with a gorgonian. It is extremely long-lived, with a lifespan of 2,700 years, and develops into a large tree-like colony.

Description
Savalia savaglia forms a large, tree-like colony. The polyps secrete a horny brown or black skeleton from which they project. Each polyp has an oral disc at the top surrounded by about thirty tentacles. These are arranged in two whorls and are not pinnate, making it easy to recognise that this species is a zoanthid rather than an octocoral or a member of another order of Hexacorallia.

Distribution
Savalia savaglia is found in the western Mediterranean Sea between the Straits of Gibraltar and Sardinia. It is also found in the Atlantic Ocean, its range including the Canary Islands, Madeira, and the Atlantic coasts of Spain and Portugal. The species is uncommon throughout most of its range, though rather more common in the Gulf of Corinth and the Sea of Marmara.

Ecology
A colony of Savalia savaglia often starts by colonising the surface of a gorgonian such as Paramuricea clavata or Eunicella singularis. In time it engulfs these gorgonians and produces its own rigid skeleton, making it self-supporting. The skeleton is rich in histidine and contains the unusual ecdysterone, ajugasterone-C. The growth rate of the colony is slow and carbon-14 dating techniques have given an age of 2,700 years, giving this zoanthid one of the longest lifespans of any organism on Earth. Because of its longevity and its large, rigid three-dimensional skeleton, it is considered to be a habitat modifier, reducing current velocity, stabilising sedimentation and increasing local deposition of fine particles. It also promotes biodiversity on the seabed.

The polyps of S. savaglia feed by capturing plankton and other particles from the water, and can also absorb dissolved nutrients.

Colonies of S. savaglia are either male or female. Spawning took place in December when the seawater started to cool. This zoanthid can also reproduce asexually.

References

External links 
 
 

Invertebrates of Europe
Animals described in 1819
Parazoanthidae
Cnidarians of the Atlantic Ocean
Fauna of the Mediterranean Sea